The 1999–2000 Scottish Third Division was won by Queen's Park who, along with second and third  placed Berwick Rangers and Forfar Athletic, gained promotion to the Second Division. Albion Rovers finished bottom.

Table

Scottish Third Division seasons
3
4
Scot